Gareth Ghee is a hurler from County Longford, Ireland. He has been Longfords main scorer for many years. In 2010 he helped them win the Lory Meagher Cup when the beat Donegal in the final in Croke Park, he scored 0-08 in the game he later won the Lory Meagher GPA Player of the Year. He played in two Leinster Junior Hurling Championship finals in 2003 and 2004 but lost both to Meath.

He plays his club hurling with Longford Slashers and won Longford Senior Hurling Championship medals in 2000 and 2001. He has also won Longford Senior Football Championship medals in 2010. 2011. 2013

References

Year of birth missing (living people)
Living people
Longford hurlers
Longford Slashers hurlers